Kalateh-ye Bagh (also Romanized as Kalāteh-ye Bāgh) is a village in Ghazali Rural District, Miyan Jolgeh District, Nishapur County, Razavi Khorasan Province, Iran. At the 2006 census, its population was 70, in 16 families.

References 

Populated places in Nishapur County